USS Voyager (NCC-74656) is the fictional Intrepid-class starship which is the primary setting of the science fiction television series Star Trek: Voyager. It is commanded by Captain Kathryn Janeway. Voyager was designed by Star Trek: Voyager production designer Richard D. James and illustrator Rick Sternbach. Most of the ship's on-screen appearances are computer-generated imagery (CGI), although models were also sometimes used. The ship's motto, as engraved on its dedication plaque, is a quote from the poem "Locksley Hall" by Alfred, Lord Tennyson: "For I dipt in to the future, far as human eye could see; Saw the vision of the world, and all the wonder that would be."

The Voyager made its television debut in January 1995 in "Caretaker", the most expensive pilot in television history, reportedly costing $23 million. In addition to its namesake television show, the spacecraft appeared in the computer game Star Trek: Voyager Elite Force (2000). The spacecraft design was also used for Star Trek: The Experience, a theme park in Las Vegas from 1998 to 2008, and as album art.

Concept and design
Rick Sternbach, who designed the Borg cube for The Next Generation, and Richard James collaborated over several months to design the USS Voyager. Sternbach started work on the new design in the fall of 1993 when the new series was announced. By the spring of 1994, the design had started to mature, and was smaller than The Next Generation Enterprise-D with features like the ability to land on a planet's surface. The interior design focused on the bridge, which set the tone for the rest of ship. Throughout the design process, the main goal was to make it new and appealing while still holding in part to the same familiar design.

Voyager special effect shots were done with both miniatures and CGI. The miniature shots of the Voyager model were used as a benchmark to improve the CGI shots. Two different computer models were developed from the physical model by two different companies that scanned it, Amblin Imaging and Foundation Imaging. Amblin won an Emmy for Voyager opening CGI title visuals featuring USS Voyager passing through space, but the weekly episode exteriors were captured with hand-built miniatures of Voyager. By late 1996 (midway through season three), certain exterior shots were fully CGI. Another challenge of the design was coordinating the interior set design with exterior shots, in particular the location of key rooms and the design of windows. These were important, for example, in shots that crossed over from outside the spacecraft to inside the spacecraft in one filming shot.

The principal model of Voyager used for filming sold at a Christie's auction in 2006 for USD $132,000.

Mission
Voyager was launched in 2371. The crew's first orders were to track down a Maquis ship in the Badlands. An alien force called the Caretaker transported both Voyager and the Maquis vessel across 70,000 light-years to the Delta Quadrant, damaging Voyager and killing several crewmembers (including the medical staff, helm officer Stadi, first officer Cavit and the chief engineer). Voyager and the Maquis ship are ultimately stranded in the Delta Quadrant to prevent a genocide of the Ocampans, a species on a nearby planet under the Caretaker's protection from the Kazon, an antagonistic race native to the Delta Quadrant who seek the resources of the Ocampa. Captain Janeway orders the destruction of the device that could transport Voyager and the Maquis vessel home, thereby protecting the Ocampa. Stranded, and with the Maquis ship also destroyed, both crews integrate and work together for the anticipated 75-year journey home.

The intended crew complement was 141 Starfleet personnel, though it held 153 for its inaugural mission. This figure fluctuated during its time in the Delta Quadrant, gaining or losing count due to mishaps, adopted crew, births, and voluntary departures; they start the second year of their journey with 152 people on board, at one point during the fifth year of its journey, there were 150 people on board.

Starfleet Command eventually becomes aware of the ship's presence in the Delta Quadrant and is later able to establish regular communication. After a seven-year journey, during which the acquisition of new technologies and assistance from various allies had already enabled the ship to travel a distance that otherwise would have taken 23 years, the ship returned to the Alpha Quadrant via a Borg transwarp conduit.

The Federation starship USS Voyager NCC-74656-J appears for a couple of seconds in Star Trek: Discovery season 3 episode "Die Trying", indicating that an iteration of USS Voyager survived to at least the year 3189 (one year on from Michael Burnham's arrival in this time period).

Design and capabilities
The 15-deck (257 rooms), 700,000-metric-ton Voyager was built at the Utopia Planitia Fleet Yards and launched from Earth Station McKinley.

Voyager was equipped with 47 bio-neural gel packs and two holodecks. It was the first ship with a class-9 warp drive, allowing for a maximum sustainable speed of Warp 9.975. Variable geometry pylons allowed Voyager and other Intrepid-class ships to exceed warp 5 without damaging subspace. Like the Galaxy Class, Voyager warp nacelles were below the primary hull. The ship also was capable of planetary landings. Unlike the Galaxy Class, the ship could not separate the saucer during an emergency. It instead would eject the warp core (as seen in the season 4 episode "Day of Honor" and the season 7 episode "Renaissance Man").

Voyager also had an Emergency Medical Hologram (EMH) programmed with a library of more than five million different medical treatments from 2,000 medical references and 47 physicians. The EMH gained the capability to leave the sickbay during the mission's third year, thanks to a 29th-century "mobile emitter".

The ship was initially equipped with 40 photon torpedoes with type VI warheads, two of which were equipped with tricobalt devices. Both tricobalt devices were used to destroy the Caretaker's array. Quantum torpedoes were also compatible with Voyager launchers, with some modifications. Voyager housed five standard torpedo launchers (two fore, two aft, one ventral) and was able to fire up to four torpedoes per launcher at once. In the final episode, an alternate future Kathryn Janeway equipped the ship with transphasic torpedoes and ablative hull armor.

During the years in the Delta Quadrant, the ship is augmented with custom, non-spec upgrades and modifications, some of which are modified from technology of other cultures, an example being Seven of Nine's alcoves and the Delta Flyer which both utilize modified Borg technology. Several pieces of technology from the future were also installed in the final episode, courtesy of Admiral Janeway who went back in time to bring Voyager home. Some of the adaptive solutions are to compensate for the disadvantages of being 70,000 light-years from port, such as the airponics bay and the transformation of the Captain's dining room to a galley, and the acquisition of enhancements from aliens in the Void that massively increases replicator efficiency.

The Borg are a major source of technological upgrades conducted on Voyager. Cargo bay 2 is equipped with several Borg alcoves when Captain Janeway forms an alliance with the Borg and several Borg are forced to work aboard Voyager during the alliance. Seven of Nine and Harry Kim build an astrometrics lab from scratch with Borg-enhanced sensors, knowledge of which Seven of Nine retained from the Borg. Additionally, the crew designed and built the Delta Flyer support craft at the behest of the character Tom Paris later in the series.

Shuttlecraft
An important shuttlecraft in many episodes, and operated from the USS Voyager, was a spacecraft called the Delta Flyer. The Delta Flyer was introduced in the Season 5 episode "Extreme Risk", and was designed and constructed by the crew in the context of the show. The design of the fictional spacecraft by the production staff and how it was presented in special effects has been written about in books about the franchise. The Delta Flyer was designed by illustrator Rich Sternbach, and exterior views were rendered by computer graphics by Foundation Imaging.

One of Voyagers shuttles, the Aeroshuttle, was integrated with the hull in the saucer section and although it was never used in an episode, the production team did develop special effects test footage of it disembarking. Voyager Aeroshuttle was intended as a warp-capable vessel that could also fly in atmospheres; the footage was made by CGI team leaders Rob Bonchune and Adam Lebowitz, along with the VFX producer Dan Curry. Two other craft, the Manta and Cochrane were also developed but the Manta was not used. Cochrane was used in Threshold for the purpose of reaching warp 10.

Presentations
In addition to its namesake television show, the spacecraft appeared in the computer game Star Trek: Voyager Elite Force (2000). The spacecraft design was also used for Star Trek: The Experience, a theme park in Las Vegas from 1998 to 2008, and as album art. The designs was shown on cover art for LaserDisc releases also.

In computer gaming
The Voyager design appeared in Star Trek: Voyager which originally aired on UPN network from 1995 to 2001, but was also used in a number of computer and video games in that period in various capacities. One was Star Trek: Voyager – Elite Force which came out in 2000. This was a computer game style known as a first-person shooter and received a positive reception by the gaming community at that time. Voyager Elite Force was ranked second out of ten of the best Star Trek games up to 2015. Its sequel was published in 2003. One game based on the show, Voyager (circa 1995), was cancelled but has been an influence on other games since.

Merchandise
The model-making company Revell released a plastic model of USS Voyager. Another pre-built offering was made of metal, and a reviewer praised the "swooshy" 'arrowhead' style of the design. The form of the design commonly appears in relation to Voyager merchandise, or elsewhere in places that make use of Star Trek franchise content; for example, a view of USS Voyager was shown as album art for a 4-CD music collection from the show released in 2017.

Production
In late October 1994, the USS Voyager model was delivered to Image G, who did the motion-control photograpy video work with the model for the special effects shots for the upcoming launch of the Star Trek: Voyager television show. Image G also did the motion control photography for the Caretaker Array, as well as for the Maquis and Kazon vessels.

The main sets for the interior of the spacecraft were located at Stage 8 and Stage 9 at Paramount Studios.

One of the more complex sets for the spacecraft was the bridge of Voyager. The bridge of Voyager had 11 different monitors of three different sizes, that had custom graphics displayed depending on what was being shot for each scene. For a scene with the "red alert" setting, the appropriate video graphics would have to be displayed on cue. These graphics were created a by a team of people, with a need for both static and video graphics. Depending on the episode, custom graphics or video sequences would have to be made by a creative team. The videos were recorded to videocassette to be played at the right time, such as when an actor (e.g. Voyager crew) was looking at a monitor.

The ship's design and sets were also used in the Star Trek: Deep Space Nine episode "Inter Arma Enim Silent Leges", this time as the USS Bellerophon, Voyagers sister ship.

See also
Enterprise (NX-01) (Enterprise 2001–2005)
USS Enterprise (NCC–1701) (Star Trek 1966–1969)
USS Defiant (Deep Space Nine 1994–1999)

References

External links

Designing the USS Voyager 
 Designing the USS Voyager - By Rick Sternbach

Star Trek spacecraft
Bioships
Star Trek: Voyager